Bø Church is a parish church of the Church of Norway in Bø Municipality in Nordland county, Norway. It is located in the village of Bø i Vesterålen.  It is one of the churches for the Bø og Malnes parish which is part of the Vesterålen prosti (deanery) in the Diocese of Sør-Hålogaland. The red, wooden church was built in a cruciform style in 1824, using plans drawn up by an unknown architect. The church seats about 370 people.

History
Over the centuries, there have been several different church buildings. The first church at Bø was probably built around 1340. It is referenced 
in 1381, from the letters Diplomatarium Norvegicum. A new church was built around 1440, and the third approximately 1540. The fourth church was built in 1639. The fifth church building was completed in 1734, a little east of where the present church is located.

In 1814, this church served as an election church. Together with more than 300 other parish churches across Norway, it was a polling station for elections to the 1814 Norwegian Constituent Assembly which wrote the Constitution of Norway. This was Norway's first national elections. Each church parish was a constituency that elected people called "electors" who later met together in each county to elect the representatives for the assembly that was to meet in Eidsvoll later that year.

In 1824, the sixth and present church was built.  It was consecrated on 8 August 1824 by the Bishop Mathias Bonsach Krogh, Bishop of the Diocese of Hålogaland. The church was originally red painted, but in 1917 it was painted white. After the last restoration in 1970-1971, the church was again painted red.

Inventory
The church's fixtures are historic and include valuable objects. The pulpit is from 1762. The altar plate is characterized by the Renaissance era.  German born artist Gottfried Ezekiel (ca. 1719-1798) gave the colors blue and green to the altarpiece. The artwork around the altarpiece is in gold leaf. Ezekiel first received a commission as a painter in Bergen during 1744. Dating from 1751 he arrived in northern Norway, where he painted a number of church altarpieces.

Media gallery

See also
List of churches in Sør-Hålogaland

References

Bø, Nordland
Churches in Nordland
Wooden churches in Norway
Cruciform churches in Norway
19th-century Church of Norway church buildings
Churches completed in 1824
14th-century establishments in Norway
Norwegian election church